Goes Petshopping is the first album by West End Girls, the Pet Shop Boys tribute band. In Japan, the album is entitled We Love Pet Shop Boys!, and it features an exclusive bonus track.

Track listing

Goes Petshopping
 "I'm Not Scared"
 "Domino Dancing"
 "Suburbia"
 "Rent"
 "Shopping"
 "You Only Tell Me You Love Me When You're Drunk"
 "West End Girls"
 "Being Boring"
 "Love Comes Quickly"
 "It's a Sin"
 "Jealousy"

We Love Pet Shop Boys!
 "I'm Not Scared"
 "Domino Dancing"
 "Suburbia"
 "Rent"
 "Shopping"
 "You Only Tell Me You Love Me When You're Drunk"
 "West End Girls"
 "Being Boring"
 "Love Comes Quickly"
 "It's a Sin"
 "Jealousy"
 "Go West"

External links
 West End Girls official website

2006 debut albums